Burak Erdoğan may refer to:

 Ahmet Burak Erdoğan (born 1979), Turkish businessman
 Mehmet Burak Erdoğan (born 1972), Turkish mathematician